Carinurella paradoxa is a species of crustacean in family Niphargidae, and the only species in the genus Carinurella.

References

Niphargidae
Freshwater crustaceans of Europe
Monotypic crustacean genera
Taxonomy articles created by Polbot